Ballerina or Roses for Bettina is a 1956 West German drama film directed by G. W. Pabst and starring Willy Birgel, Elisabeth Müller and Ivan Desny.  It was shot at the Bavaria Studios in Munich. The film's sets were designed by the art directors Hertha Hareiter and Otto Pischinger.

Cast
 Willy Birgel as Professor Förster
 Elisabeth Müller as Bettina Sanden
 Ivan Desny as Kostja Tomkoff, Choreograph
 Eva Kerbler as Irene Gerwig
 Leonard Steckel as Opernintendant
 Carl Wery as Dr. Brinkmann
 Hermann Speelmans as Kalborn
 Erich Ponto as Schimanski, Pförtner
 Art Blakey as Jazzmusiker

References

Bibliography 
 Rentschler, Eric. The Films of G.W. Pabst: An Extraterritorial Cinema. Rutgers University Press, 1990.

External links
 

1956 films
1950s German-language films
1956 drama films
West German films
German drama films
German black-and-white films
Films directed by G. W. Pabst
1950s German films
Films shot at Bavaria Studios